Tales That Witness Madness is a 1973 British anthology horror film produced by Norman Priggen, directed by veteran horror director Freddie Francis, written by actress Jennifer Jayne.

The film was one of several in a series of anthology films made during the 1960s and 1970s which included Dr. Terror's House of Horrors (1965), Torture Garden (1967), The House That Dripped Blood (1970), Asylum (1972), Tales from the Crypt (1972), The Vault of Horror (1973) and From Beyond the Grave (1974). These portmanteau horror films were all produced by Amicus Productions. Tales That Witness Madness is sometimes mistaken for an Amicus production; however, it was actually produced by World Film Services.

Plot
In the Clinic link episodes, Dr Tremayne (Donald Pleasence), a psychiatrist in a modern mental asylum, reveals to colleague Dr Nicholas (Jack Hawkins) that he has solved four special cases. Tremayne explains the case histories of patients Paul, Timothy, Brian, and Auriol, presenting each in turn to Nicholas:

In Mr Tiger, Paul (Russell Lewis) is the sensitive and introverted young son of constantly bickering parents Sam (Donald Houston) and Fay Patterson (Georgia Brown). Amid the unhappy domestic situation he befriends an "imaginary" tiger.

In Penny Farthing, antique store owner Timothy (Peter McEnery) stocks a strange portrait of "Uncle Albert" (Frank Forsyth) and a penny farthing bicycle he has inherited from his aunt. In a series of episodes, Uncle Albert compels Timothy to mount the bicycle, and he is transported to an earlier era where he courts Beatrice (Suzy Kendall), who was young Albert's love interest. These travels place Timothy's girlfriend Ann (also Suzy Kendall) in peril.

In Mel, Brian Thompson (Michael Jayston) brings home an old dead tree, which he lovingly calls Mel, mounting it in his modern home as a bizarre piece of found object art. He increasingly shows unusual attention to Mel, angering his jealous wife Bella (Joan Collins).

In Luau, an ambitious literary agent, Auriol Pageant (Kim Novak), lasciviously courts new client Kimo (Michael Petrovich); he shows more interest in her beautiful young daughter Ginny (Mary Tamm). Auriol plans a sumptuous luau for him; when the plans fall through, Kimo's associate Keoki (Leon Lissek) takes over. The luau, as organised by Keoki, is actually a ceremony to assure Kimo's dying mother Malia (Zohra Sehgal) passage to "heaven" by appeasing a Hawaiian god, and a requirement is that he consume the flesh of a virgin: Ginny.

In the Epilogue, Tremayne watches as manifestations of the patients' histories materialise. Nicholas cannot see the manifestations and has Tremayne declared insane, apparently for believing the patients' bizarre accounts. Nicholas enters the patient holding area, and is killed by "Mr Tiger".

Cast
 Segment "Clinic Link Episodes"
 Jack Hawkins - Dr Nicholas  
 Donald Pleasence - Dr Tremayne  
 Charles Gray - Nicholas (segment "Clinic Link Episodes") (voice) (uncredited)
 Segment "Mr Tiger"
 Georgia Brown - Fay  
 Donald Houston - Sam  
 Russell Lewis - Paul  
 David Wood - Tutor  
 Segment "Penny Farthing"
 Suzy Kendall - Ann Beatrice
 Peter McEnery - Timothy 
 Neil Kennedy - 1st Removal Man
 Richard Connaught - 2nd Removal Man
 Beth Morris - Polly 
 Frank Forsyth - Uncle Albert 
 Segment "Mel"
 Joan Collins - Bella  
 Michael Jayston - Brian 
 Segment "Luau" 
 Kim Novak - Auriol  
 Michael Petrovitch - Kimo  
 Mary Tamm - Ginny  
 Lesley Nunnerley - Vera  
 Leon Lissek - Keoki  
 Zohra Sehgal - Malia   (as Zohra Segal)

Production
Tales That Witness Madness was filmed at Shepperton Studios on 35 mm, with an aspect ratio of 1.85:1. It was the last film of Frank Forsyth, who appears as Uncle Albert. Jack Hawkins died shortly after his scenes were filmed. Hawkins had had his larynx removed in an operation in 1966, and here his voice was dubbed by Charles Gray in post-production. Tales That Witness Madness was Hawkins' final film appearance.

Kim Novak broke a four-year hiatus from films with her appearance in Tales. She replaced Rita Hayworth shortly after production started.

Evaluation
The Encyclopedia of Horror writes that the film "avoids farce and develops a nicely deadpan style of humour which is ably sustained by the excellent cast in which only Novak appears unable to hit the right note." Kim Newman in Nightmare Movies calls the film "unreleasable" but with no further elaboration; presumably he found it sub-par.

References

External links
Allmovie

Tales That Witness Madness at Rotten Tomatoes

1973 films
1973 horror films
British comedy horror films
British anthology films
Films about cannibalism
1970s English-language films
British supernatural horror films
1970s comedy horror films
Films directed by Freddie Francis
British horror anthology films
1973 comedy films
1970s British films